is a retired Nippon Professional Baseball pitcher who spent 10 years with the Hanshin Tigers in Japan's Central League.

Professional career
Watanabe joined the Hanshin Tigers after being picked in the fourth round of the 2005 university/adult draft. After spending his first season with the Tigers' farm team, he enjoyed relative success as a reliever, appearing in at least 45 matches between the years 2007 and 2012, earning a total 14 wins, 6 losses and 53 hold points from 332 appearances with an ERA of 2.53. He was used less starting from the 2013 season and only made one first-team appearance in 2015, pitching one scoreless inning.

External links

Living people
1982 births
Baseball people from Tokushima Prefecture
Nippon Professional Baseball pitchers
Japanese baseball players
Hanshin Tigers players